Kingstone High School is a mixed secondary school located in Kingstone in the English county of Herefordshire.

Previously a community school administered by Herefordshire Council, Kingstone High School converted to academy status in August 2011. However the school continues to coordinate with Herefordshire Council for admissions, and mainly serves the areas of South Hereford and the Golden Valley.

Kingstone High School offers GCSEs and BTECs as programmes of study for pupils. The school building was built in the 1960s, with other buildings added later.

References

External links
Kingstone High School official website

Secondary schools in Herefordshire
Academies in Herefordshire